The South American Football Confederation (CONMEBOL) is the administrative and controlling body for association football in most of South America. It consists of 10 member associations, each of which is responsible for governing football in their respective countries. It includes all countries and territories within South America, with the exceptions of Guyana, French Guiana, Suriname, which are part of CONCACAF, and the disputed British and Argentine territory of the Falkland Islands, which is not a member of any confederation. Each CONMEBOL member has its own football league system. Clubs playing in each top-level league compete for the title as the country's club champion. Clubs also compete in the league and national cup competitions (if applicable) for places in the following season's CONMEBOL club competitions, the Copa Libertadores and Copa Sudamericana. Due to promotion and relegation, the clubs playing in the top-level league are different every season.

For clubs playing at lower divisions, see the separate articles linked to in the relevant sections.

Argentina 

 Country: Argentina
 Football association: Argentine Football Association
 Top-level league: Primera División
The Primera División is the top level of Argentine football league, and is organized by the Argentine Football Association. Founded in 1893, it currently consists of 30 teams, but is planned to reduce in size to 24 teams by the 2019–20 season. The professional era started in 1931 when professionalism was instituted. Teams from Argentina have won the most international titles with a tally of 73, which includes 25 Copa Libertadores. Currently, the league is regarded as one of the strongest leagues in the world.

As of the 2023 season:

Bolivia 

 Country: Bolivia
 Football association: Bolivian Football Federation
 Top-level league: Bolivian Primera División
Bolivia's first division started in 1977 as the Liga de Fútbol Profesional Boliviano, though football had been played in Bolivia since the early 1900s, specially in La Paz and Oruro.

As of the 2023 season:

Brazil 

 Country: Brazil
 Football association: Brazilian Football Confederation
 Top-level league: Campeonato Brasileiro Série A
Campeonato Brasileiro was created in 1959 as a knockout tournament between state champions. From 1967 to 1987 the best clubs of each state championships were separated in several groups with final play-offs or a final group stage. Every year some aspects of format, number of entrants and rules were changed. Promotion and relegation rules were adopted in 1988, and since 2003 a double round robin format is played every year from May to December.

As of the 2023 season:

 Chile 

 Country: Chile
 Football association: Chilean Football Federation
 Top-level league: Primera División
The Primera División del Fútbol Profesional Chileno was founded on January 24, 1926, and is currently ranked 14th in the IFFHS Best Leagues of the World ranking. In 2016, the league is also known as Campeonato Scotiabank.As of the 2023 season: Colombia 

 Country: Colombia
 Football association: Colombian Football Federation
 Top-level league: Primera A

The Categoría Primera A has been in existence since 1948. As of 2015, brewery company Bavaria sponsors the league, which is currently called Liga Águila after one of the company's brands. The league is rated 21st in the world according to IFFHS.

 Ecuador 

 Country: Ecuador
 Football association: Ecuadorian Football Federation
 Top-level league: Serie A
The Serie A has its roots in the national championship between the top teams of Ecuador's two regional leagues. Since the first tournament in 1957, a national champion has been crowned 51 times on a yearly basis (except 1958 & 1959), and twice in 2005. Starting from the 2010 season a new format consisting of three stages was used. This format lasted until 2018, when it was decided that the league would expand from 12 to 16 teams.As of the 2023 season: Paraguay 

 Country: Paraguay
 Football association: Paraguayan Football Association
 Top-level league: Primera División
Liga Paraguaya's first game was played in 1906. It joined CONMEBOL in 1921, and FIFA in 1925. The professional era of the competition in the Liga started in 1941. During the 1990s, the FA changed its denomination from Liga Paraguaya del Futbol to Asociacion Paraguaya de Futbol. Currently, the league is regarded as one of the top 10 national competitions in the world.As of the 2023 season: Peru 

 Country: Peru
 Football association: Peruvian Football Federation
 Top-level league: Liga 1
The Liga Peruana de Football (Peruvian Football League) was first founded in 1912 and organized the Primera División, as well as the Segunda División, until 1921. Due to disagreements in the organization of the Liga Peruana de Football, the Peruvian Football Federation was founded in 1922 and organized its first league in 1926. In 1941 the Asociación No Amateur took the stand as the league's organizer and renamed the league Campeonato de Selección y Competencia.As of the 2023 season: Uruguay 

 Country: Uruguay
 Football association: Uruguayan Football Association
 Top-level league: Primera División
Liga Profesional de Primera División, the top-flight professional football league in Uruguay, was founded in 1900 and is currently contested by 16 teams. In 2016, the league underwent a transition from the European calendar to a year calendar, which is used from the 2017 season onwards.As of the 2023 season: Venezuela 

 Country: Venezuela
 Football association: Venezuelan Football Federation
 Top-level league: Primera División
The Primera División was created in 1921 and turned professional in 1957. The 2016 season consisted of 20 clubs, a number that was reduced to 18 for the following season. Currently, the league is rated 41st in the world by IFFHS.As of the 2023 season:

See also

List of top-division football clubs in AFC countries
List of top-division football clubs in CAF countries
List of top-division football clubs in CONCACAF countries
List of top-division football clubs in OFC countries
List of top-division football clubs in UEFA countries
List of top-division football clubs in non-FIFA countries
Domestic football champions

References

External links
Official website of CONMEBOL
The RSSSF Archive – Domestic Results (America) at RSSSF

Association football in South America
+CONMEBOL